Alan Robert Marsham (6 August 1920 – 7 April 1990) was an Australian rules footballer who played for the Geelong Football Club in the Victorian Football League (VFL).

Family
The son of former Geelong footballer Harry "Nipper" Marsham (1890-1932) and Olive Gertrude Elizabeth Marsham, nee McQueen (1893–1950), Alan Robert Marsham was born in Geelong on 6 August 1920.

Alan Marsham married Marie Elaine Dawson in 1943.

Education
He attended Geelong College.

Williamstown (VFA)
In 1941 he transferred to the VFA club Williamstown.

Notes

References

External links 

 The VFA Project: Alan Marsham.
 Boyles Football Photos: Alan Marsham.

1920 births
1990 deaths
Australian rules footballers from Geelong
Geelong Football Club players
Williamstown Football Club players
People educated at Geelong College